Johnny Budz (born in New Jersey) is an American DJ, producer and remixer. He is one of the most recognizable DJs in the Tri-state holding residencies at D'Jais, Surf Club, Webster Hall, Joey's, DNA, Rise, and many many more. He also owns and operates one of the largest and most successful DJ entertainment companies Elite Sound Entertainment. For over 20 years he's been heard on radio and satellite channels across the United States on Sirius XM's Channel BPM (BPM), 103.5 WKTU, Pulse 87, Music Choice TV, and other radio stations. He was one of the first mix show DJs to appear on NYC's WKTU and was a staple on the station from 1996 - 2009. He has remixed for the likes of Janet Jackson, Jessica Simpson, Ciara, Kim Sozzi, INXS, and many more and has released 9 commercial mixed CDs.

Discography

Albums
Freestyle Fever's Divas, Vol. 1 (2001)
80's Energy (2002)
Hit the Breaks (2003)
Hit Factory (2004)
Rewind 2: Greatest Party Hits (2004)
Hit Factory 2 (2005)
Ultra.Dance 07 (2006)
Ultra.Trance 06 (2006)
Ultra.Weekend 3 (2007)

Remixography
 2003: "Amanda" - Brooklyn Queens
 2003: "Can You Stand the Rain" - Sa-Fire feat. Cynthia
 2003: "Never" - Roc Project feat. Tina Arena
 2003: "A Toast to Men" - Willa Ford feat. May
 2003: "Heaven" - Eyra Gail
 2003: "You Promised Me" - In-Grid
 2003: "No Way, No How" - Jocelyn Enriquez
 2004: "Without Love - Sun
 2004: "All I Need Is a Miracle" - Tina Ann
 2004: "This Joint Is Jumpin" - Lisa Hunt
 2004: "Party Time" - Raw Deal
 2004: "Take Your Mama" - Scissor Sisters
 2004: "Vision of Love" - See Alice feat. Simon Luca
 2004: "Back to Me" - Elissa
 2004: "Shadows" - House of Voodoo
 2004: "Pop!ular" - Darren Hayes
 2004: "Burning" - Robbie Rivera & Axwell
 2004: "Deja Vu" - Roc Project feat. Tina Novak
 2004: "1, 2 Step" - Ciara feat. Missy Elliott
 2004: "If You Don't Know Me By Now" - Aubrey
 2005: "Fading Like a Flower" - Discreet
 2005: "Desperate Religion" - Haley
 2005: "Sunshine" - Jacinta
 2005: "Summer in the City 2005" - Budz vs. Fonseca
 2005: "Wherever You Are" - Bryan Todd
 2005: "Do The Damn Thing" - Rupee
 2005: "Lose Control" - Missy Elliott feat. Ciara & Fatman Scoop
 2005: "Oh" - Ciara feat. Ludacris
 2005: "50 Ways to Leave Your Lover" - Plummet
 2005: "Everything With You" - D:Fuse
 2005: "Killin Me" - Jenna Drey
 2005: "Can't Go On" - Allie
 2005: "Who Is She 2 U" - Brandy
 2006: "Medicine" - Mike Cruz feat. Sandy B.
 2006: "You Shine" - Luz Divina
 2006: "Fade Away" - Sarah Atereth
 2006: "Pretty Vegas" - INXS
 2006: "Alone" - Kim Sozzi
 2006: "Ooh La La" - Goldfrapp
 2006: "A Public Affair" - Jessica Simpson
 2006: "Break Up" - Kim Sozzi
 2007: "I Can't Take It" - Lola
 2007: "I Want You" - Peter Presta & Billy Brown feat. Sarah Mattea

References

External links

Artist Main on Yahoo! Music

American DJs
Club DJs
Living people
People from New Jersey
Remixers
Year of birth missing (living people)
Electronic dance music DJs